Lee Mi-young (born March 16, 1961) is a South Korean actress. Lee was a sophomore at Han Kang Girls' Commercial High School when she joined the Miss Haitai beauty pageant in 1978. She was hired at MBC's 10th Open Recruitment in 1979, and made her acting debut in 1980. Lee retired in 1985 after marrying singer Jeon Young-rok, but returned to acting in 1991 and continues to be active in television dramas.

Lee and Jeon divorced in 1997. Their two daughters are both singers: Jeon Boram is a member of girl group T-ara, while Jeon Wooram is a member of girl group D-Unit. Lee remarried in 2003 to Keith Johnston, an American music professor at University of Maryland University College's Yongsan campus; the couple divorced in 2005.

Filmography

Television series

Film

Awards and nominations

References

External links 
 
 
 
 
 

1961 births
Living people
South Korean television actresses
South Korean film actresses